Emmanuel Lacresse (born 14 July 1971) is a French politician from the Democratic Movement who has been Member of Parliament for Meurthe-et-Moselle's 2nd constituency in the National Assembly since 2022.

See also 

 List of deputies of the 16th National Assembly of France

References 

Living people
1987 births
People from Toulon
Deputies of the 16th National Assembly of the French Fifth Republic
21st-century French politicians
Members of Parliament for Meurthe-et-Moselle
Democratic Movement (France) politicians